Deryl Northcott is a New Zealand accounting academic. She is currently a full professor at the Auckland University of Technology.

Academic career

After a 1996 PhD titled  'Uses of accounting information in capital investment decision making'  at the University of Waikato, she moved to the University of Manchester in the UK, before returning to New Zealand and Auckland University of Technology in 2002 as full professor.

Selected works 
 Llewellyn, Sue, and Deryl Northcott. "The average hospital." Accounting, Organizations and Society 30, no. 6 (2005): 555–583.
 Hopper, Trevor, Deryl Northcott, and Robert William Scapens, eds. Issues in management accounting. Pearson education, 2007.
 Alkaraan, Fadi, and Deryl Northcott. "Strategic capital investment decision-making: A role for emergent analysis tools?: A study of practice in large UK manufacturing companies." The British Accounting Review 38, no. 2 (2006): 149–173.
 Northcott, Deryl. Capital investment decision-making. Cengage Learning EMEA, 1992.

References

External links
  

Living people
New Zealand women academics
Academic staff of the Auckland University of Technology
Academics of the University of Manchester
University of Waikato alumni
New Zealand accountants
Year of birth missing (living people)